Filippos (Greek: Φίλιππος) is a small island of the Echinades (Drakoneres subgroup), among the Ionian Islands group of Greece. As of 2011, it had no resident population.

References

External links
Filippos on GTP Travel Pages (in English and Greek)

Echinades
Islands of the Ionian Islands (region)
Landforms of Cephalonia
Islands of Greece